I Gede Siman Sudartawa (born September 8, 1994) is an Indonesian swimmer. He specializes in backstroke.  In the 2011 Southeast Asian Games, he won four gold medals and set 2 SEA Games' records.

In 2012 Summer Olympic, he was qualified as rank 39.
He was also the flag bearer for 2012 in opening ceremony. He became the first Indonesian swimmer to swim in World Aquatics Championships semifinal after he finished sixteenth overall in 50 metre backstroke at the 2017 World Aquatics Championships held in Budapest, Hungary.

References 

1994 births
Living people
Indonesian male swimmers
Olympic swimmers of Indonesia
Swimmers at the 2012 Summer Olympics
Male backstroke swimmers
Swimmers at the 2010 Asian Games
Swimmers at the 2014 Asian Games
Swimmers at the 2018 Asian Games
Sportspeople from Bali
People from Klungkung Regency
Balinese sportspeople
Indonesian Hindus
Southeast Asian Games gold medalists for Indonesia
Southeast Asian Games silver medalists for Indonesia
Southeast Asian Games bronze medalists for Indonesia
Southeast Asian Games medalists in swimming
Competitors at the 2011 Southeast Asian Games
Competitors at the 2013 Southeast Asian Games
Competitors at the 2015 Southeast Asian Games
Competitors at the 2017 Southeast Asian Games
Asian Games competitors for Indonesia
Competitors at the 2019 Southeast Asian Games
Islamic Solidarity Games competitors for Indonesia
Islamic Solidarity Games medalists in swimming
21st-century Indonesian people